Parjanya() also known as Parjanya Maharaja or Parjanya is one of the son of  Yadava king Devamida and the brother of Shurasena. He was also paternal grandfather of Krishna and father of the Nanda.

According to Mahabharata and Puranas, he was born to second wife of king Devamida and was given the charge as chieftain of Mahavan (a region of Braj).

See also 
Nanda
Shurasena
Yadava

References

Characters in the Mahabharata
People related to Krishna